The Olga is a river in Olginsky District, Primorsky Krai, Russia. It flows into the Olga Bay of the Sea of Japan.

References

Rivers of Primorsky Krai
Drainage basins of the Sea of Japan